Hysén is a Swedish surname. Notable people with the surname include:

Alexander Hysén (born 1987), Swedish football goalkeeper 
Antonio Hysén (born 1990), Swedish football player 
Glenn Hysén (born 1959), Swedish footballer and manager
Tobias Hysén (born 1982), Swedish footballer

See Also
 Hysen

Swedish-language surnames